Kingdom of Albania may refer to: 

Kingdom of Albania (medieval) — from the Capetian House of Anjou
Albanian Kingdom (1928–1939) — from the House of Zogu
Albanian Kingdom (1939–1943) — from the House of Savoy during the Italian occupation
Albanian Kingdom (1943–1944) — during the German occupation

See also
Principality of Arbanon
Principality of Albania (medieval) — from the House of Thopia and the House of Balsha
Principality of Albania — from the House of Wied